Ignacio Colombini (born 12 May 1992) is an Argentine professional footballer who plays as a forward for Chilean side Audax Italiano.

Career
Colombini, who is of Italian descent, moved into senior football with Primera División side Racing Club. He made five appearances in total for the Avellaneda outfit, including for his senior bow on 2 February 2010 against Colón at the Estadio Brigadier General Estanislao López. In August 2013, Colombini switched Argentina for Uruguay after agreeing terms with Miramar Misiones. He featured eleven times in the 2013–14 Uruguayan Primera División as they suffered relegation, though he didn't feature in the second half of the campaign; he also netted two goals, scoring in fixtures with Montevideo Wanderers and Cerro Largo.

Colombini returned to his homeland with Almagro in July 2014. He scored on his starting debut against Platense, on the way to appearing thirty-two times across two seasons in Primera B Metropolitana. Colombini made a return to the top-flight in January 2016 with Quilmes, though went back to the third tier seven months later by joining Almirante Brown. He remained for 2016–17 and 2017–18, scoring nine goals in each campaign which included braces over Talleres and Deportivo Español. Fellow Primera B Metropolitana team Atlanta signed Colombini on 29 July 2018. Fourteen goals in his opening twenty-seven games came.

June 2019 saw Colombini agree a move to Paraguayan football with Sol de América. He netted on debut against Nacional, with further goals in the Primera División versus Deportivo Santaní (home and away) and San Lorenzo arriving as they finished fifth. In January 2020, Colombini headed back to Uruguay to join Defensor Sporting. He'd score away goals against Liverpool and Boston River across the 2020 season, before departing at the end of the year following the expiration of his contract. On 8 February 2021, Colombini sealed a return to Atlanta; who were now a Primera B Nacional club.

Ahead of the 2022 season, Colombini returned to his former club Almirante Brown. On second half 2022, he moved to Chile and joined Audax Italiano.

Career statistics
.

References

External links

1992 births
Living people
Sportspeople from Buenos Aires Province
Argentine sportspeople of Italian descent
Argentine footballers
Association football forwards
Argentine expatriate footballers
Expatriate footballers in Uruguay
Expatriate footballers in Paraguay
Expatriate footballers in Chile
Argentine expatriate sportspeople in Uruguay
Argentine expatriate sportspeople in Paraguay
Argentine expatriate sportspeople in Chile
Argentine Primera División players
Uruguayan Primera División players
Primera B Metropolitana players
Paraguayan Primera División players
Primera Nacional players
Chilean Primera División players
Racing Club de Avellaneda footballers
Miramar Misiones players
Club Almagro players
Quilmes Atlético Club footballers
Club Almirante Brown footballers
Club Atlético Atlanta footballers
Club Sol de América footballers
Defensor Sporting players
Audax Italiano footballers